Tasmantrix lunaris is a moth of the family Micropterigidae. It is known from eastern Australia, where it is known from two localities in the southern coastal forests of New South Wales.

The forewing length is 3.2 mm for males and 3.1 mm for females. The forewing groundcolour has a bronzy-purple iridescence. There are two white fasciae. The first is an elongate subcostal J-shaped streak, of more or less parallel-width, extending from the base to the anal margin at about mid-length and the second is a large oblique oval patch extending toward the termen from the costa at about two thirds. The fringes are black and white tipped. The hindwing is dark grey with bronzy-purple reflections. The fringes are black.

Etymology
The name is from the Latin lunaris (meaning crescent-shaped) and refers to the unique shape of the
forewing fascia of this species.

References

Micropterigidae
Moths described in 2010